The Church of St. Martin was a Roman Catholic church in the village of , Erkelenz in North Rhine-Westphalia, Germany, dedicated to Saint Martin of Tours. It was built between 1906 and 1907 in the Gothic Revival style to designs of the architect . It took over the role from a medieval church which was located nearby, which was demolished upon completion of the new building.

The church was deconsecrated in 2014, and it was demolished in February 2016 as part of the destruction of the entire village of Borschemich in order to make way for the Garzweiler surface mine. A  was built as its replacement in Neu-Borschemich between 2013 and 2015.

History

The Church of St. Martin was built between 1906 and 1907 according to designs of the architect  and under the direction of the contractor Max Sauer. It was blessed on 27 October 1907 by dean Hermann Josef Kamp from Erkelenz, on behalf of the Archbishop of Cologne, Anton Hubert Fischer. The church was consecrated in honour of Saint Martin of Tours on 9 October 1915 by the auxiliary bishop .

The building took over the role of an earlier church, which was originally built in the 12th century, and was rebuilt in 1451 and renamed, extended and reconstructed in 1784. By the 19th century, the old church was insufficient, and it was demolished after the completion of the new church building

The church was built out of brick, and it had a single aisle with three bays in the nave, behind which was a triumphal arch and a choir. It had arched groin vaults. The building had a capacity of 150 people seated and 100 standing.

The church suffered some damage in 1945 during World War II, but it was repaired in 1950. A comprehensive renovation of both the exterior and interior was undertaken in 1982.

Deconsecration and demolition

The village of Borschemich was on the planned route for the extension of the Garzweiler surface mine, a large lignite mine operated by the company RWE. The entire village was therefore demolished in the 2010s, with the company building a new settlement known as Neu-Borschemich as its replacement. RWE purchased the Church of St. Martin in 2013, and it was deconsecrated on 23 November 2014. Demolition of the church began at 10:00 am on 15 February 2016. The sacristy was demolished first, followed by the sanctuary. The tower was demolished a few days later.

See also
 Church of St. Lambertus, Immerath

References

External links
 

Gothic Revival church buildings in Germany
Destroyed churches in Germany
Roman Catholic churches in North Rhine-Westphalia
Buildings and structures in Heinsberg (district)
Heritage sites in North Rhine-Westphalia
Roman Catholic churches completed in 1907
1907 establishments in Germany
Buildings and structures demolished in 2016
2016 disestablishments in Germany
20th-century Roman Catholic church buildings in Germany